The International Dragon Boat Federation is the international governing body for the sport of dragon boat racing. IDBF was founded in Hong Kong on June 24, 1991 by Australia, China, Taiwan, Great Britain, Hong Kong, Indonesia, Italy, Malaysia, Norway, the Philippines, Singapore, and the United States . IDBF currently has 75 member countries or territories and is supported by five continental federations.  

IDBF is a Member of the Alliance of Independent Recognized Members of Sport (AIMS).

IDBF organizes world championships each year: a World Nations Championships one year and a club Crew World Championships the next.  These championships are held at venues within member countries.

History of IDBF 

Although the origins of the sport of dragon boat racing can be traced back at least 2,000 years, its origins as an international sport really only go back to the 1970s.

In 1976, the Hong Kong Tourist Association invited a crew from Nagasaki, Japan, to compete against nine Hong Kong fishermen crews as part of the annual racing at Shau Kei Wan.  The objective was to help to promote Hong Kong as a tourist destination during the summer low season.

The event was a success and more and more international crews started to participate in the racing now held at East Tsim Sha Tsui.  The local Hong Kong Amateur Rowing Association became involved and helped draft the first ever set of international race rules for dragon boats.

By 1991, several national dragon boat federations had been formed and it became clear that an international governing body ought to be established.  So, on 24th June 1991, at a meeting in Hong Kong, the International Dragon Boat Federation was founded.  The founding national federations were: Australia, China, Chinese Taipei (Taiwan), Great Britain, Hong Kong, Indonesia, Italy, Malaysia, Norway, the Philippines, Singapore, and the United States.

In 1992, IDBF published its first set of race rules and the technical specifications that would govern the boats and paddles used for racing.

In 1995, in Yue Yang, China, IDBF held its first World Nations Championships.  Over 800 athletes representing 14 nations participated.

In 1996, in Vancouver, Canada, IDBF held its first Club Crew World Championships.  This attracted over 250 athletes from 10 clubs from six nations.

Thereafter, the biennial sequence of World Nations Championships one year and Club Crew World Championships the next has been maintained (except for 2020 and 2021 when COVID prevented championships from taking place).

The sport has grown significantly since those early days and 30 nations (some 3,250 athletes) competed in the 2109 World Nations Championships and an incredible 140 clubs (some 6,200 athletes) competed in the 2018 Club Crew World Championships.

Objectives 
The seven objectives of the IDBF are:

 To protect and maintain the Asian cultural, historical and religious traditions of Dragon Boating
 To promote and develop the sport of Dragon Boat Racing
 To ensure that the International Regattas are governed by Rules of Racing adapted to the development of the sport of Dragon Boat Racing
 To encourage the organization of International Regattas open to all Member Associations and their Member Clubs
 To establish International Championship Regattas under the titles of World Championships
 To maintain the principles of amateurism in all competitions according to the definition of an amateur and the rules laid down in the IDBF Rules of Racing
 To encourage the formation of Governing Associations in countries where none exist"

Mission 
On the IDBF website, the IDBF notes that, "The IDBF shall observe the general and fundamental principles of the Olympic Charter and IOC Manual on sport and the environment."

The IDBF lists the following four principles of service to its members:

 "To support and maintain the authority and autonomy of its Members and to promote closer links between its Members
 To convey to other organizations the views of its Members and to co-ordinate and protect the common interests of its Members. 
 To collaborate, on behalf of its Members, with organization having as an objective the promotion of sport and particularly those paddle sports in which the use of the single bladed paddle is paramount. The IDBF Council may offer or countenance competitive events for watercraft, of any Design, propelled by a single blade paddle.
 To collect, collate and circulate information form, to and among its Members and to publish an annual Calendar of IDBF sanctioned events."

Executive committee 
The IDBF Executive Committee, as of January 2023, consists of:

 President: Mike Thomas (Great Britain)

 Senior Vice President: Raymond Ma (Hong Kong)

 2nd Vice President: Matthew Smith (Canada)

 3rd Vice President: Julie Doyle (Ireland)

 4th Vice President: Claudio Schermi (Italy)

 5th Vice President: Liu Aijie (China)

 General Secretary: Peter Tang Tak Seng (Macau)

 Treasurer: Alan Van Caubergh (Netherlands)

 Deputy Treasurer: Loretta Lewis (Australia)

 Marketing & Media Commission: Belinda Chung (Australia)

 Competition & Technical Commission: Melanie Cantwell (Australia)

 Athletes Commission: Sue Holloway (Canada)

 Medical & Sports Science Commission: Bridget Walker (Switzerland)

Members 
There are 75 member nations of the IDBF. Classes of membership are Full, Ordinary, and Associate.

The 47 Full Members of the IDBF are:

Australia, Austria, Canada, China, Chinese Taipei, Cyprus, Czech Republic, France, Germany, Ghana, Great Britain, Guam, Hong Kong, Hungary, India, Indonesia, Iran, Ireland, Italy, Japan, Macau, Malaysia, Moldova, Myanmar, Netherlands, New Zealand, Norway, Philippines, Poland, Puerto Rico, Reunion Island, Russia, Senegal, Serbia, Singapore, Slovakia, South Africa, South Korea,  Spain, Sweden, Switzerland, Thailand, Trinidad & Tobago, Uganda, Ukraine, United Arab Emirates, United States of America, .

The 28 Ordinary and Associate Members of the IDBF are:

Albania, Argentina, Armenia, Bahrain, Bangladesh, Brazil, Brunei, Cambodia, Cameroon, Chile, Egypt, Georgia, Israel, Ivory Coast, Jamaica, Kenya, Lithuania, Mauritius, Mongolia, Nepal, Nigeria, Oman, Panama, Qatar, Romania, Somalia, Venezuela, Vietnam.

Continental and affiliated federations 
There are five continental federations recognised by IDBF. These federations govern dragon boat in their geographic areas, and organize their own regional/continental championships.

 Pan-American Dragon Boat Federation (PADBF), covering North America and South America.
 European Dragon Boat Federation (EDBF), covering Europe.
 Asian Dragon Boat Federation (ADBF), covering Asia.
 Oceania Dragon Boat Federation (ODBF), covering Oceania.'
 Dragon Boat Federation of Africa (DBFA), covering (Africa)

IDBF also recognises two federations as affiliated to IDBF:

 International Breast Cancer Paddlers Commission

 International Ice Dragon Boat Federation

IDBF Commissions 
IDBF maintains the following commissions to assist it in the management of the sport (with the names in brackets after each the current chair of that commission):

 Athletes (Sue Holloway)

 Athletes Entourage (Barbara Michaels)

 Competition & Technical (Melanie Cantwell)

 Marketing & Media (Belinda Chung)

 Medical & Sports Science (Bridget Walker)

 Para Athletes (Nigel Bedford)

 Sport for All (Li Hanjie)

 Women in Sport (Gitta Weberi)

 Youth (Wendi Zhou)

Racing and competition classes 
For all IDBF-sanctioned competition, teams are divided into the following racing classes by gender and age.

Racing classes 
Open class: no restrictions on crew composition.

Women's class: crews must be all-female.

Mixed class: crews must comprise a mix of male and female athletes as set out in IDBF's race rules

Para Dragons class: two categories of racing (with no restrictions on age or gender):

→ PD1 - all paddlers must have a recognised impairment

→ PD2 - 50% of the paddlers must have a recognised impairment

Cancer paddlers: two categories of racing (with no restriction on age or gender):

→ Breast Cancer Paddlers (BCP) - all crew members must have had breast cancer

→  All Cancer Paddlers (ACP) - all crew members must have had cancer

Age classes
For the purposes of IDBF championships, a competitor's age is the age they would be on 31st December in the year of the competition. 

IDBF provides racing for the following age classes:

Premier - no age restrictions

Junior class (note all paddlers must be over the age of 12, but the drummer and steerer can be older)

→ 18 and under

→ 16 and under

→ 14 and under

24 and under - for paddlers over the age of 12 and up to 24

Senior class

→ Senior A - 40 and over

→ Senior B - 50 and over

→ Senior C - 60 and over

Boat classes 
Races are divided into two boat classes:

Standard boat: 20 paddlers plus the drummer and the steerer (helm), making the total crew 22.

Small boat: 10 paddlers plus the drummer and the steerer (helm), making the total crew 12.

Race distances 
At IDBF championships, racing is conducted over the following distances:

200 metres

500 metres

1,000 metres

2,000 metres

World Nations Championships (WNC) 
The IDBF hosts the World Nations Championships, also known as the World Dragon Boat Racing Championships (WDBRC), every odd-numbered year. Each country fields one team per class. Athletes for these national teams are most typically chosen individually.

The IDBF Congress is also held in conjunction with each WDBRC.

A list of WDBRCs is below:

Club Crew World Championships (CCWC) 
The IDBF hosts the Club Crew World Championships (CCWC) every even-numbered year. Unlike those competing at the WDBRC, teams at CCWC are already-established teams that represents each country in each class.

A list of CCWCs is below:

Equipment specifications and licensing 
As the global governing body of dragon boat, the IDBF determines official specifications for equipment and licenses companies to manufacture dragon boat equipment, including paddles and boats.

Licensed paddle manufacturers include: Braca Sports, Burnwater, Decathlon, Eclipse Innovations, Gray Owl, Hangzhoug Fuyang, Hornet Watersports, Kajner Sport, King Paddle, Kanoe Sports, Merlin Paddles, Trivium, Typhoon Limited, Wenzhou Yuansu Sport Co., and Zaveral Racing Equipment.

Licensed dragon boat manufacturers include: BuK, Champion, Shanghai Pei Sheng Boat Corporation, Foshen Ouyue Sports Equipment Co., Ltd, Hangzhou Rui Dragon Boat Co., Kim Tuck Huat Boat Builder, Wenzhou Yuansu Sport Co., Ltd.

See also
Hong Kong Tourism Board
GAISF

References

External links
IDBF homepage
Dragon Boating Not Just for Asians

Dragon boat racing